Somalia Governorate was one of the six governorates of Italian East Africa. It was formed from the previously separate colony of Italian Somalia, enlarged by the Ogaden region of the conquered Ethiopian Empire following the Second Italo-Ethiopian War.

History

The Somalia Governorate lasted from 1936 until 1941. Its administrative capital was Mogadishu. In 1936, the capital had a population of 50,000 inhabitants, of which nearly 20,000 were Italian Somalis. 

By 1941, 30,000 Italians lived in Mogadishu, representing around 33% of the city's total 90,000 residents. They frequented local Italian schools that the colonial authorities had opened, such as the "Liceum".

The Italian authorities in 1937 began construction of a paved highway from Mogadishu to Addis Ababa, which was completed in 1940. Other roads were started in 1939, from Mogadishu to the northern Somali coast and to the British Kenya Colony to the south.

Additionally, there was a project to connect Mogadishu with the Addis Ababa-Djibouti railway, and another to start the construction of an airport on the outskirts of the city. The ports of the capital and of Kismayo further south were also slated for enlargement in 1941. However, the outbreak of World War II put a halt to these plans.

In the summer of 1940, Italian forces conquered British Somaliland and incorporated it into the Somalia Governorate. British troops later re-seized the territory in March 1941.

See also
Italian Somaliland
List of Governors of the Somalia Governorate

Notes

Bibliography
G. Pini. La strada nell’Africa Orientale Italiana in “Quaderni italiani serie xv, L’Africa Italiana” n. 4

Governorates of Italian East Africa
History of Somalia